Billboard Top Hits: 1992 is a compilation album released by Rhino Records in 2000, featuring ten hit recordings from 1992.

The track lineup includes five songs that reached the top of the Billboard Hot 100 chart. The remaining songs all reached the top ten of the Hot 100.

Track listing

Track information and credits were taken from the album's liner notes.

References

2000 compilation albums
Billboard Top Hits albums